Christopher (1786–1855) and John Greenwood (fl. 1821–1840) were brother cartographers who produced large-scale maps of England and Wales in the 1820s. 
Their partnership began in 1821, using  the imprint "C.&J.Greenwood".

Christopher was born in Wakefield, Yorkshire, He moved to London in 1818. His first map publication (of Yorkshire) was based on his own surveying.

In 1759 the Society for the Encouragement of Arts, Manufacture and Commerce announced a prize of £1000 for an original survey of England at a scale of one-inch-to-the-mile (approx. 1:63,000). The first recipient of the award was Benjamin Donn whose map of Devon, completed in 1765, had taken five and a half years to produce. Maps of many counties followed.

The Greenwoods' intention was for a series of maps of the whole country at a one-inch scale. They did not achieve this, largely because of competition from the newly founded Ordnance Survey, but their output includes superb maps that were finely drafted and elegantly engraved. Between 1817 and 1830 they produced a series of splendid large-scale folding maps of most of the counties based on their own surveys.

Their Atlas of the Counties of England (c.1834) was beautifully engraved and decorated with large vignettes of prominent buildings of the county. The maps were engraved on steel, a more durable medium than copper. Some of them were issued uncoloured, but most are now found with full-wash colour across the body of the map.

Publications
 1818:  Christopher Greenwood's Map of Yorkshire, 1818; Henry Teesdale’s Map of Yorkshire, 1828; Map of the county of York, made on the basis of triangles in the county, determined by Lieutenant Coll. Wm Mudge, Royal Artillery, F.R.S. and Captain Thomas Colby, Royal Engineers, in the Trigonometrical Survey of England, by order of the Honourable Board of Ordnance, and surveyed in the years 1815, 1816, & 1817, by C. Greenwood, Wakefield. Leeds, Robinson, Son & Holdsworth, Wakefield, John Hurst & C. Greenwood, 4 June 1817.
 1817–30 Large-scale maps of all the counties except Buckinghamshire, Cambridgeshire, Herefordshire, Hertfordshire, Norfolk, Oxfordshire and Rutland
 1834 Atlas of the Counties of England
 1827 Greenwood's Map of London 1827 - from surveys in 1824, 1825 and 1826

Books about the Greenwoods
John Brian Harley (1962) Christopher Greenwood, county mapmaker

1786 births
1855 deaths
English cartographers
19th-century cartographers
19th-century English people
People from Wakefield